St Peter's Church is a church in Bardon, Leicestershire. It is a Grade II listed building.

History
The church was designed by J.B. Everard (1844–1923),who is buried in the churchyard, and was built in 1899, in memory of the Everard family. It is built of granite and its exterior masonry is laid like crazy paving.

The tower has three bells cast in 1899 by John Taylor & Co of Loughborough. The tower's saddleback roof is topped off by a flèche.

References

Bardon
Bardon